Victor Kayode Igbekoyi (born 1 September 1986) is a Nigerian football midfielder. He formerly played for North Carolina FC in the USL Championship.

Career

Club
On 27 June 2015, Igbekoyi became Zira's first foreign signing.

On 27 August 2018, Igbekoyi signed for North Carolina FC in the United Soccer League On 3 December 2019, North Carolina announced that they had declined the option on Igbekoyi's contract and therefore he'd become a free agent.

International
On 23 August 2012, Igbekoyi was selected in Sierra Leone's 19-man squad for their 2013 Africa Cup of Nations qualification match against Tunisia. Days later, Igbekoyi was withdrawn from the squad, before he was cleared to represent Sierra Leone in October 2012.

Career statistics

Club

References

External links

1986 births
Living people
Nigerian footballers
Nigerian expatriate footballers
Azerbaijan Premier League players
Turan-Tovuz IK players
Qarabağ FK players
AZAL PFK players
Zira FK players
North Carolina FC players
Association football midfielders
USL Championship players
Expatriate footballers in Azerbaijan
Expatriate soccer players in the United States
People from Ondo City